Paleckis is the masculine form of a Lithuanian family name. Its feminine forms are: Paleckienė (married woman or widow) and Paleckytė (unmarried woman).

The surname may refer to:
Algirdas Paleckis (born 1971), Lithuanian politician
Justas Paleckis (1899–1980), Lithuanian journalist and communist politician
Justas Vincas Paleckis (born 1942), Lithuanian journalist and politician

Lithuanian-language surnames